Vietnam Electricity (full name: Vietnam Electricity Group, abbreviated name: EVN) is the largest power company in Vietnam. Vietnam Electricity (EVN) was established by the government of Vietnam as a state-owned company in 1994, and has operated officially as a one-member limited liability company since 2010.

EVN runs its own large-scale hydropower and coal-fired power plants with a total installed capacity of 28,169 MW, which contribute up to 58% of the national power generation system, while controlling three power generation corporations (GENCOs 1,2,3), one power transmission corporation (National Power Transmission Corporation - EVNNPT), and five regional power distribution corporations (for the North, Central, South and the two cities of Hanoi and Ho Chi Minh), while managing the operation of the national power system through the National Load Dispatch Center

Subsidiaries 
 National Power Transmission Corporation
 Power Generation Corporation No. 1
 Power Generation Corporation No. 2
 Power Generation Corporation No. 3
 Northern Power Corporation
 Central Power Corporation
 Southern Power Corporation
 Hanoi City Power Corporation
 Ho Chi Minh City Power Corporation
 National Load Dispatch Center
 Electric Power Trading Company
 Electric Information Centre
 Information Technology Centre

References 

Electric power companies of Vietnam
Economy of Hanoi
Government-owned companies of Vietnam